Khadem Beg Talish (died 1514) was a Sufi and military commander of Talysh origin, who served the Safavid order, and later the dynasty established by the order, the Safavid dynasty. Khadem Beg was a retainer of Soltan Ali Safavi and his brother Ismail Mirza, when they were child, and an important advisor to the Shah Ismail.

He died in Battle of Chaldiran.

Career 
Khadem Beg served in many of the campaigns of Shah Ismail, especially in one against Arabian Iraq. In 1508, the Shah conquered Baghdad and made him as first governor of Baghdad and the whole province, an office which included the task of supervising the Holy shrine of Karbala. Before holding governorship of Baghdad, he was Amir-e Divan (later called Divan-beigi) of the Safavid Empire.

Family 
Yadegar Ali Sultan Talish, Khadem Beg's grandson, became Khalifat al-Khulafa for a brief in 1626–1627 and succeeded by his son, Badr Khan Sultan Talish.

See also 
 Abdal Beg Talish

References

Sources 

 
 
 
 

1514 deaths
15th-century births
15th-century Iranian military personnel
16th-century Iranian military personnel
16th-century people of Safavid Iran
Divan-beigi
Iranian military personnel killed in action
Safavid generals
Safavid governors of Baghdad
Talysh people